Karma is an important topic in Buddhist thought. The concept may have been of minor importance in early Buddhism, and various interpretations have evolved throughout time. A main problem in Buddhist philosophy is how karma and rebirth are possible, when there is no self to be reborn, and how the traces or "seeds" of karma are stored throughout time in consciousness.

Vedic religion
The concept of karma originated in the Vedic religion, where it was related to the performance of rituals or the investment in good deeds to ensure the entrance to heaven after death, while other persons go to the underworld.

Early Buddhism
The concept of karma may have been of minor importance in early Buddhism. Schmithausen has questioned whether karma already played a role in the theory of rebirth of earliest Buddhism, noting that "the karma doctrine may have been incidental to early Buddhist soteriology." Langer notes that originally karma may have been only one of several concepts connected with rebirth. Tillman Vetter notes that in early Buddhism rebirth is ascribed to craving or ignorance. Buswell too notes that "Early Buddhism does not identify bodily and mental motion, but desire (or thirst, trsna), as the cause of karmic consequences." Matthews notes that there is no cohesive presentation of karma in the Sutta Pitaka, which may mean that the doctrine was incidental to the main perspective of early Buddhist soteriology.

According to Vetter, the "Buddha at first sought, and realized, "the deathless" (amata/amrta), which is concerned with the here and now. Only after this realization did he become acquainted with the doctrine of rebirth." Bronkhorst disagrees, and concludes that the Buddha "introduced a concept of karma that differed considerably from the commonly held views of his time." According to Bronkhorst, not physical and mental activities as such were seen as responsible for rebirth, but intentions and desire.

The doctrine of karma may have been especially important for common people, for whom it was more important to cope with life's immediate demands, such as the problems of pain, injustice, and death. The doctrine of karma met these exigencies, and in time it became an important soteriological aim in its own right.

The Three Knowledges
The understanding of rebirth, and the reappearance in accordance with one's deeds, are the first two knowledges that the Buddha is said to have acquired at his enlightenment. According to the Buddhist tradition, the Buddha gained full and complete insight into the workings of karma at the time of his enlightenment. According to Bronkhorst, these knowledges are later additions to the story, just like the notion of "liberating insight" itself. According to Tilmann Vetter, originally only the practice of dhyana, and the resulting calming of the mind may have constituted the liberating practice of the Buddha.

Later developments
According to Vetter, probably in the first centuries after the Buddha's death the following
ideas were introduced or became important:
 all evil deeds must be requited or at least be superseded by good deeds before a person can become released,
 pleasant and unpleasant feelings in a human existence are the result of former deeds,
 evil behavior and its results form a vicious circle from which one can hardly escape,
 Gotama could become Buddha because he did good deeds through countless former lives, devoting their result to the aim of enlightenment,
 by confession and repentance one can (partly) annul an evil deed,
 evil deeds of non-Arhats (as to Arhats see point 1) can be superseded by great merits,
 one can and should transfer merit to others, especially for their spiritual development.

See also
 Index of Buddhism-related articles
 Karma
 Karma in Buddhism
 Secular Buddhism

Notes

References

Sources

Printed sources

Web-sources

Further reading
 
 

Buddhist philosophy
Buddhist belief and doctrine